Landscape with Grotto is an oil on panel painting by Flemish painter Joos de Momper. The painting was completed in the 1610s, possibly in 1616, and is currently housed at the Rheinisches Landesmuseum in Bonn.

Painting
Joos de Momper was part of a group of Flemish landscapists whose paintings often depicted foreign and craggy topography. His landscapes often included a grotto, such is the case with the present oeuvre.

There are three figures on the bottom left. One of them is a shepherd leaning on his staff. His flock of sheep is grazing on the meadow below. Two of the three figures are sitting. One of them has been described as an artist, sketching the rocks and the waterfall in front of them.

References

Further reading
 Livre Peinture de paysage, Norbert Wolf, Taschen, 2008. 
 Goldkuhle/Krueger/Schmidt 1982, p. 362-363
 Bergvelt/Jonker 2016, p. 244, under DPG314 and DPG323 (David Teniers II; RKD, nos. 289996 and 289998)
 K. Ertz, K. Schütz, A. Wied et al., Das flämische Landschaft 1520–1700, Lingen 2003 [exh. Villa Hügel, Essen/Kunsthistorisches Museum, Vienna 2003–4], p. 324–325, no. 119

External links
The painting at LVR official website
The painting at the Web Gallery of Art

16th-century paintings
17th-century paintings
Landscape paintings
Paintings by Joos de Momper
Paintings in Bonn